Scolecobonaria is a genus of fungi in the class Dothideomycetes. The relationship of this taxon to other taxa within the class is unknown (incertae sedis).

The genus name of Scolecobonaria is in honour of Lee Bonar (1891-1977), an American botanist and professor at the University of California, Berkeley.

See also 
 List of Dothideomycetes genera incertae sedis

References

External links 
 Scolecobonaria at Index Fungorum

Dothideomycetes enigmatic taxa
Dothideomycetes genera